Hirenarti is a village in Dharwad district of Karnataka, India.

Demographics 
As of the 2011 Census of India there were 607 households in Hirenarti and a total population of 3,010 consisting of 1,524 males and 1,486 females. There were 377 children ages 0-6.

References

Villages in Dharwad district